Mitchell Gilbert (born 10 May 1995) is a Malaysian-Australian racing driver. He has participated under both nationalities at various points in his career.

Career 
Born in Kuala Lumpur, Gilbert began his racing career in 2002 in karting, where he was active until 2010. In 2009 he finished third in the KF2 - class of the CIK-FIA World Cup.

At the end of 2010 Gilbert debuted in Formula racing in the winter championship of the British Formula Renault Championship for Fortec Motorsport, under an Australian licence. While his teammate Alex Lynn was champion in this class, Gilbert was tenth, with a best result of third place. In 2011 he made his debut in the main championship of British Formula Renault. While his teammates Alex Lynn and Oliver Rowland ended the season first and second, respectively, Gilbert was fifth in the championship, including a victory at Croft . In 2011, he participated in three race weekends of the Eurocup Formula Renault 2.0 for Fortec.

In 2012 Gilbert made his debut in Formula 3 in the German Formula 3 Championship for the team Performance Racing. With two victories on the TT Circuit Assen and Lausitzring, he finished fourth in the championship behind Jimmy Eriksson, Lucas Auer and Kimiya Sato. At the end of the season he also took part in the Macau Grand Prix for Mücke Motorsport, where he finished eighteenth.

In 2013 Gilbert stepped over to the new FIA European Formula Three Championship, where he also drove for Mücke Motorsport. Only at the Nürburgring and Circuit Park Zandvoort did he manage to score points, with a best result of eighth at the Nürburgring, he finished 23rd in the championship with ten points.

In 2014 Gilbert moved to Fortec Motorsports in European Formula Three. He also made his debut in the GP3 Series during the race weekend at Silverstone, where he replaced Denis Nagulin at the team Trident.

In 2015, Gilbert will remain in GP3, switching to Carlin Motorsport. He netted a sole point in his only full season and was dropped by Carlin at seasons' end.

From 2016, Gilbert switched to GT racing and began competing with a Malaysian licence. He finished third in Porsche Carrera Cup Asia, before moving into GT3 with Audi in 2017.

Racing record

Career summary

Complete FIA Formula 3 European Championship results
(key)

† Guest driver, he was ineligible for points.

Complete GP3 Series results
(key) (Races in bold indicate pole position) (Races in italics indicate fastest lap)

† Driver did not finish the race, but was classified as he completed over 90% of the race distance.

External links
 

1994 births
Living people
Sportspeople from Kuala Lumpur
Malaysian people of Australian descent
Malaysian racing drivers
British Formula Renault 2.0 drivers
German Formula Three Championship drivers
Formula Renault Eurocup drivers
FIA Formula 3 European Championship drivers
Australian GP3 Series drivers
Carlin racing drivers
Karting World Championship drivers
Australian racing drivers
Tech 1 Racing drivers
Performance Racing drivers
Mücke Motorsport drivers
Trident Racing drivers
W Racing Team drivers
Fortec Motorsport drivers
Saintéloc Racing drivers
Asian Le Mans Series drivers